Mob4Hire is a privately held Canadian Web 2.0 company. It primarily provides crowd-sourced mobile application testing services (see also: List of crowdsourcing projects). It also conducts market research in the global wireless telephony space.

The company facilitates the relationship between mobile application developers and professional users who test the functionality and assess the usability of the application(s).

The services are based on a bidding model with a fixed-fee structure. As the broker for these transactions, Mob4Hire derives revenue as a flat percentage of each transaction agreed to by the developer and tester. The company also accrues income from up-front licensing fees, ongoing subscriptions, managed accounts and other services.

The business model also incorporates enterprise customers. "Mob4Hire As A Platform" [MAAP] effectively re-branded the Mob4Hire model. O2 Litmus, a British division of the global carrier Telefonica has implemented Mob4Hire technology and launched their own community of developers and testers.

General overview
Mob4Hire brokers relationships between mobile application developers and a global testing community. Developers post pre-release applications and associated test plans to the community and specify which handsets and networks are under consideration. Individuals (or groups) registered in the testing community (Mob) that are able to fulfil the functional requirements of the test bid for the contract. Developers select testers based on criteria such as the community ranking of the tester, turn-around time for delivered test reports, the tester’s desired pay-scale and other metrics.

Mob4Hire is responsible for holding payment in escrow until the developer is satisfied. Once the developer has approved the test report, monies are then released to the tester via PayPal.

The developer is expected to grade the quality of each tester. This feedback establishes a rating hierarchy among the testing community; the intent is to continually improve the overall quality that the application test reports, and grade the relative skill and efficacy of the individual testers.

Mob4Hire is also concerned with the user experience of mobile applications. The process involved is similar to the functionality testing process, except that the testers are focused on the usability of the application being considered each time, as well as the overall user experience, rather than a purely functional assessment.

A paradigm of software design is that developers are the least desirable group to test their own releases and, in general, developer bias can be mitigated by employing a testing group completely independent of the design process. The testers are locally based on the actual networks on which the applications will be launched and as such, their assessment more closely emulates genuine market feedback than ‘in-house’ testing conducted remotely from the network.

Developers conduct mobile surveys in the global space by paying testers to download applications and complete a survey with demographic information relevant to the developer. The intent is to collect key market research from a community of unbiased early adopters with minimized costs to the developer.  Examples of typical survey questions may include: Was the application intuitive? How would you describe the user experience? Would you pay for the application and if so, how much? Were there features that should be included or enhanced? How did the interface appear on the handset? Would you recommend the application?

Mob4Hire builds and maintains a global community of application developers and testers. There are currently almost 1,000 registered developers and market research firms in 111 countries, 42,000 registered testers in 142 countries and 65,000 contractors in 185 countries. The testers represent 364 carrier networks. Mob4Hire is also associated with 20 professional entities that develop, test and port mobile applications.

History
Paul Poutanen, the founder and current president of Mob4Hire, credits the inspiration of the crowdsourced mobile application testing paradigm to an insight he had in the San Francisco airport. Poutanen and several colleagues had spent a week testing a mobile phone based game on a carrier in the Bay Area. They had purchased ten handsets with subscriptions for a demonstration to a local client, and Poutanen was considering the overall expenses of the network tests while awaiting a return flight. He saw a fellow traveller speaking on the identical handset and considered how much time and money he could have saved if that user had done his testing for him. Poutanen wrote a business idea and presented it to the Cambrian House community, a Calgary-based crowdsourcing community for software and business applications. Members from the community then helped building the original Mob4Hire platform. Mob4Hire was incorporated in September, 2007 and the beta version of the Mob4Hire platform was launched in March, 2008.

November, 2008: O2 Litmus, a U.K. subsidiary of Telefonica, became the first carrier to adopt and implement Mob4Hire technology [MAAP] as a "white-label" testing community.

November, 2008: Stephen King appointed CEO of Mob4Hire.

January, 2009: At the GSMA 2009 Mobile Innovation Global Competition in Barcelona, Spain, Mob4Hire was named Top 15 Innovator Chosen for Most Innovative True Mobile Start-up Category in Global Tournament.

March, 2009: Mob4Hire partners with Wavefront.

March, 2009: Mob4Hire enters marketing deal with Gamelion.

May, 2009: Mob4Hire awarded Red Herring 100 North America.

July, 2009: Mob4Hire collaborates with Navteq for LBS application testing.

November, 2009: Mob4Hire wins Investor Choice awards at Vancouver Angel Forum.

November, 2009: Mob4Hire and Flurry Analytics announce a joint collaboration.

December, 2009: Infostretch and Mob4Hire form partnership.

February, 2010: Mob4Hire joins the BlackBerry ISV Alliance Program.

March, 2010: Mob4Hire releases preliminary Global Wireless Survey.

March, 2010: Perfecto Mobile and Mob4Hire form partnership.

April, 2010: Mob4Hire launches V4.0 platform.

April, 2010: Mob4Hire included in the 'Top 25 Canadian ICT Up and Comers' by the Branham Group.

June, 2010: Mob4Hire awarded a 'Meffy' by the Mobile Entertainment Forum for 'Most Innovative Business Model'.

Corporate affairs

Executives
 Stephen King, CEO
 Paul Poutanen, President and Founder
 John Carpenter, CTO
 Allen Poutanen, VP Business Development

Advisory board
 Randy Thompson, Venture Alberta
 Keith Cook, Device Anywhere
 Bob Hayes, Ph.D., Advocacy Expert
 Tony Fish, AMF Ventures
 Lisa Whelan, socializemobilize.com
 David Craddock, MacLeod Dixon LLP
 Jonathan Kohl, Testing Evangelist
 Marc Kornak, Advisory Board Member, Genesis Technical Solutions
 Cameron Peters, Innovation Architect
 Stephen Nykolyn, Mobile Business Dev
 Marc Wachmann, growwireless.com
 Joseph Raphael, Software Engineer

References

External links
 

Software companies of Canada